Shah Rah (also Romanized as Shāh Rāh and Shāhrāh; also known as ‘Alīābād-e Emām) is a village in Miyan Velayat Rural District, in the Central District of Mashhad County, Razavi Khorasan Province, Iran. At the 2006 census, its population was 265, in 65 families.

References 

Populated places in Mashhad County